Fereidoon Tavallali or Fereydoun Tavallali 1917, Shiraz - March 1985, Shiraz). was an Iranian poet, political commentator, archeologist and considered intellectual. In poetry, Tavallali is of a second generation of Iranian modernists, the nowpardaz (New Wave poets).

Biography 
Tavallali was born in Shiraz, Iran. His father, Jalal Tavallali, was a dignitary and treasurer the Tavallali clan. His mother, Khadijeh, was the daughter of Haj Shanbeh, a chamberlain in Ilkani Ghashgaee. The Tavallali family had cultural roots among the Qashqai nomads of the mountains of Fars Province. They served as the motevalli (guardians) of the astaneh (Islamic shrine) of Seyed Ala-Ed-Din-Hossei, Shiraz.

Education 
Tavallali was educated at home with private literary tutors. He studied Persian poetry at an early age. The messages and philosophies of Roudaki, Ferdowsi, Nezami, Saadi, Hafez, and Rumi influenced him. His family and Qashqai heritage also provided a cultural context for his literary development. He wrote his first poem at age 11. At that time, Shiraz was a centre of poetic and literary culture, not only due to its historical nature but also because the government banned most other avenues of sociopolitical activity and expression. Tavallali was also influenced by Mehdi Hamidi Shirazi, a teacher at Sultan High School and a popular local poet.

High school 
During his high school years, Tavallali created and participated in school poetry circles and social clubs. He had numerous confrontations with authorities over his controversial speeches and writings which resulted in him being expelled from three high schools. Tavallali later received his high school diploma through external examinations.

University 
In 1938, Tavallali enrolled at Tehran University and studied linguistics with Parviz Natel Khanlari and archeology. In 1942, after graduating, he returned to Shiraz and joined the Culture Ministry, with responsibilities in research in the archaeology field. Tavallali was employed at the Pars Museum of Shiraz, where he met Mahin Farbood. She shared his interest in poetry and eventually published several collections of verses. In 1942, Tavallali married Farbood.

Writing

Political commentary 
In the 1940s, Tavallali was prolific. Not only did he write poetry but also political commentary for publication in the journals of Shiraz and Tehran. During the period of Russian occupation of Iran (1941 - 1946), Tavallali joined the local communist party, the Tudeh (Mass) party. He published articles in the journals Sourouch in Shiraz and Korshide Iran and Iranema in Teheran. In 1946, a compilation of his articles was published under the title, Al-Tafasil.

Poetry 
Like other poets of his time (Shamlu, Akhavan and Forugh), Tavallali experimented with the style of Nima Yooshij.
Their poetry was in prose style with elements of Dadaism, automatism, futurism and surrealism.

Archeology 
In the early 1950s, he participated in an archaeological expedition to Shush and Pasargadae. In 1961, he was designated to work on the Elamite city of Anshan (Persia). He produced art works in Takht-e Jamshid, Fasa, and Darab. He moved to general management of Pars Archaeology and was appointed as a consultant for Iran in this field.

Works 
 Al-Tafasil
 Pouye
 Raha (Tehran 1950)
 Karvan
 Nafe
 Bazgasht
 Le Coeur Hospitalier 
 Mary

References

External links 
  

1917 births
1985 deaths
20th-century Iranian poets
Qashqai people
Iranian male poets
20th-century male writers
Faculty of Letters and Humanities of the University of Tehran alumni